The Attorney General of Mississippi is a statewide elected office in the U.S. state of Mississippi. The attorney general is a constitutional officer responsible for representing state agencies in legal matters, supplying other state officials and prosecutors with legal advice, and bringing lawsuits on behalf of the state. They serve a four-year term with no term limits.

The office was created by 1817 Constitution of Mississippi as a legislatively-elected position with a one-year term. In 1832 the office was made popularly-elective and the term was extended. All attorneys general from 1878 to 2020 were Democrats. The incumbent attorney general, Republican Lynn Fitch, was sworn-in to office on January 9, 2020.

History 
The 1817 Constitution of Mississippi provided for an attorney general to be elected by the Mississippi State Legislature for a one-year term. The legislature elected Mississippi's first attorney general, Lyman Harding, on January 21, 1818. Under the constitution of 1832, the term was extended to four years and the officer was made popularly-elective.

The 1890 state constitution maintained the attorney general of Mississippi as a popularly-elected executive official with a four-year term. The document also made the officer an ex officio member of the State Board of Education. In 1982 the constitution was amended, removing the attorney general from the board effective July 1, 1984. From 1878 until 2020, all Mississippi attorneys general were Democrats. The incumbent attorney general, Republican Lynn Fitch, was sworn-in to office on January 9, 2020. She is the first woman to hold the position.

Powers and responsibilities 
Like the seats in the Mississippi State Legislature and the other seven statewide-elected offices, the Mississippi attorney general is popularly elected every four years in the November preceding a United States presidential election year. There are no term limits for the holder of the office. Candidates for the office must meet the same constitutional qualifications as candidates for circuit court and chancery court judges; they must be at least 26 years old, have lived in the state for at least five years, and have practiced law for at least five years. The attorney general's salary is determined by law. It is currently fixed at $108,960 per year, but is set to increase to $150,000 annually in 2024.

The attorney general is the chief legal officer of the state and serves as the state's lawyer, representing its agencies, boards, and commissions in legal capacities. The attorney general's office also represents district attorneys and local judges in civil litigation, though it is forbidden by law from providing counsel to defendants in criminal cases. Only their office can bring or defend a lawsuit on behalf of the state, though they may retain private counsel to work on their own behalf in such instances. They are also empowered to appoint special investigations and prosecutors to try criminal cases on behalf of the state, and may—at their own discretion—assume responsibility for the prosecution of a crime in the event a local district attorney recuses themselves from proceedings. The attorney general is responsible for appointing the state's solicitor general. They are empowered by law to issue advisory opinions on questions of state law to statewide elected officials, legislators, state agencies, judges, and some local officials. They can also exercise powers under common law.

The Office of the Attorney General of Mississippi is split into 16 divisions. The main facilities of the attorney general and their staff are located in Jackson, though a satellite office is maintained in Biloxi and another is planned to be opened in Oxford. As of February 2023, the agency employs about 300 people, including attorneys and law enforcement officers.

List of attorneys general

Notes

References

Works cited

External links
 Mississippi Attorney General articles at ABA Journal
 News and Commentary at FindLaw
 Press releases at Mississippi Attorney General

Attorneys-General
 
1820 establishments in Mississippi